Pierre Chami, SMSP (17 December 1890 in Joun in Sidon, Lebanon - 19 August  1967) was an Archbishop of the Melkite Greek Catholic Archeparchy of Bosra and Hauran in Syria.

Life

Pierre Chami was ordained to the priesthood on June 29, 1922, and became Chaplain of the Paulist Melkites. On 13 November 1943 he was appointed successor of Nicolas Cadi as Archbishop of Bosra and Hauran and ordained bishop on October 24, 1944. Chami participated in the first and fourth sessions of the Second Vatican Council (1962–1965). His successor Nicolas Naaman, SMSP was appointed after his death in 1967.

References

External links
 http://www.gcatholic.org/dioceses/diocese/bosr0.htm
 http://www.catholic-hierarchy.org/bishop/bchami.html

1890 births
1967 deaths
Melkite Greek Catholic bishops
Lebanese Melkite Greek Catholics
Eastern Catholic bishops in Syria